V3, also known, called, and referred to as V Three, are an African-American all-female sister Christian R&B and urban contemporary gospel music trio, who primarily plays contemporary R&B songs. They come from Atlanta, Georgia, where the group started making music in 2006. The group have released a studio album, V3. This album was their breakthrough release upon the Billboard magazine charts.

Background
The all-female African-American sisters' group are from Atlanta, Georgia, where they formed in 2006. They are from oldest to youngest, LaToya Kathleen Vinson, Sacha Jo Vinson, and Shelley Dionne Vinson-Bullock. Their parents are Thomas and Dr. Carolyn Vinson, who are the pastors of High Point Christian Tabernacle located in the city of Smyrna, Georgia.

Music history
The group started in 2006, with their first studio album, V3, that was released on August 1, 2006, from EMI Gospel. This album was their breakthrough release upon the Billboard magazine Gospel Albums chart, where it peaked at No. 39. THeir second album titled "Alive" was released on November 14, 2016.

Members
Current members
 LaToya Kathleen Vinson (born November 6, 1976) 
 Sacha Jo Vinson (born March 4, 1978) 
 Shelley Dionne Vinson-Bullock (born May 30, 1980)

Discography
Studio albums

References

External links
 Official website

American gospel musical groups
Musical groups from Atlanta
2006 establishments in Georgia (U.S. state)
African-American girl groups
Musical groups established in 2006
EMI Records artists